Banca Cassa di Risparmio di Torino S.p.A. known as Banca CRT, or Caritorino, was an Italian savings bank based in Turin, Piedmont. In 1997, the bank joined Unicredito banking group, as well as in 1998 followed the group to merge with Credito Italiano to form UniCredito Italiano (now known as UniCredit). In 2002, Banca CRT was absorbed into the parent company.

The former owner of Banca CRT, Fondazione Cassa di Risparmio di Torino (Fondazione CRT), as of 31 December 2013, still owned 2.506% voting rights of UniCredit, as 7th largest shareholder. On 31 December 1999, Fondazione CRT was the second largest shareholder of UniCredit with 14.228% of the total ordinary shares (704,943,077 of 4,954,465,306).

History
Before 1950s, the bank already acquired the local banks in Casale Monferrato, Pinerolo and Ivrea.

In the 1990s, Banca CRT absorbed Banca Subalpina and Banco di Bergamo as well as had a minority shares holding in other saving banks of Bra, Fossano, Saluzzo, Savigliano and Tortona in southern Piedmont, as well as Banca della Valle d'Aosta. Banca CRT also sold the minority interests in Cassa di Risparmio di Calabria e Lucania (Carical) to a consortium of Cassa di Risparmio delle Provincie Lombarde and Fondazione Carical in 1994. The minority interests in Cassa di Risparmio di Città di Castello (40%) was also sold in 1993.

On 30 September 1997 Banca CRT joined Unicredito, which already had Cariverona Banca and Cassamarca as members. On 15 October 1998 UniCredito merged with Credito Italiano, to form UniCredito Italiano, which was the parent company of Banca CRT with 100% ownership until 2002. The former subsidiaries of Banca CRT were Banca Mediocredito di Torino (63.26% of the total shares in 2000) and Casse e Assicurazioni Vita (40% of the total shares in 2000). On 31 December 2001, Banca CRT had a shareholders' equity of €1.591 billion. On 1 July 2002, Banca CRT was absorbed into Credito Italiano along with Cariverona, Cassamarca, Caritro, C.R. Trieste and Rolo Banca. At the same time Credito Italiano was renamed into UniCredit Banca.

References

External links
  (currently redirect to UniCredit)

Defunct banks of Italy
Former UniCredit subsidiaries
Banks established in 1827
Banks disestablished in 2002
1827 establishments in the Kingdom of Sardinia
Italian companies disestablished in 2002
Companies based in Turin